Chandet Sor Prantalay, also spelled Chandet Sorpantrey (born January 13, 1973) is a Thai retired mixed martial artist and Muay Thai fighter and professional  kickboxer. Before moving to Japan and competing in top tier promotion K-1, Chandet was a former Lumpinee Stadium champion in the early 1990s and is a Thai & Kickbox SuperLeague veteran and has also fought for S-Cup and Battlarts, fighting out of Sor Prantale camp in Bangkok, Thailand. In addition, he also did amateur boxing in the 1990s.

Titles
 1994 Lumpinee Stadium Lightweight Champion (One defense)

Mixed martial arts record

|Loss
|align=center| 0-1
| UnoCaol Uno
| Submission (rear naked choke)
|K-1 Premium Dynamite!!	 	
|
|align=center|2
|align=center|0:19
|Osaka, Japan
|

Muay Thai record

|-  style="background:#fbb;"
| 2018-05-06 || Loss ||align=left| Kentaro Yoshino || J-KICK 2018～2nd～ || Tokyo, Japan || TKO  || 1 || 0:48
|-  style="background:#cfc;"
| 2017-06-25 || Win ||align=left| Seigo Nishimura || NKB Kamikaze Series vol.3|| Tokyo, Japan || Decision (Unanimous)  || 3 || 3:00
|-  style="background:#cfc;"
| 2003-06-08 || Win ||align=left| Magnum Sakai|| IKUSA|| Tokyo, Japan || Decision (Unanimous)  || 3 || 3:00
|-  style="background:#cfc;"
| 2002-06-23 || Win ||align=left| Makoto Goto || MAJKF  || Tokyo, Japan || KO   || 3 || 1:42
|-  style="background:#c5d2ea;"
| 1999-12-24 || Draw||align=left| John Wayne Parr || MAJKF TORNADO WARNING  || Tokyo, Japan || Decision  || 5 || 3:00
|-  style="background:#cfc;"
| 1999-11-26 || Win ||align=left| Noboru Uchida || MAJKF  || Tokyo, Japan || Decision (Majority)  || 5 || 3:00
|-  style="background:#cfc;"
| 1996-|| Win ||align=left| Pompet Naratrikul || Lumpinee Stadium   || Bangkok, Thailand || ||  ||
|-
|-  style="background:#fbb;"
| 1996-|| Loss||align=left| Wallop Sor.Sartpat || Lumpinee Stadium - Beer Chang Tournament  || Bangkok, Thailand || Referee Staoppge|| 5 || 
|-
|-  style="background:#cfc;"
| 1996-|| Win ||align=left| Nuathoranee Thongracha|| Lumpinee Stadium - Beer Chang Tournament  || Bangkok, Thailand || Decision || 5 || 3:00
|-
|-  style="background:#fbb;"
| 1995-04 || Loss ||align=left| Sangtiennoi Sor.Rungroj|| Lumpinee Stadium  || Bangkok, Thailand || Decision || 5 || 3:00
|-  style="background:#fbb;"
| 1994-|| Loss||align=left| Namphon Nongkeepahuyuth|| Lumpinee Stadium  || Bangkok, Thailand || Decision || 5 || 3:00
|-  style="background:#fbb;"
| 1994-09-12 || Loss ||align=left| Superlek Sorn E-Sarn || Lumpinee Stadium || Bangkok, Thailand || KO (Right Cross) || 3||

|-  style="background:#cfc;"
| 1994- || Win ||align=left| Jomhod Kiatadisak || Lumpinee Stadium  || Bangkok, Thailand || Decision || 5 || 3:00
|-  style="background:#cfc;"
| 1994-|| Win||align=left| Namphon Nongkeepahuyuth|| Lumpinee Stadium  || Bangkok, Thailand || Decision || 5 || 3:00

|-  style="background:#fbb;"
| 1994-07-|| Loss ||align=left| Jongsanan Fairtex|| Lumpinee Stadium  || Bangkok, Thailand || Decision || 5 || 3:00
|-
! colspan="8" style="background:white" |

|-  style="background:#fbb;"
| 1994-|| Loss ||align=left| Sakmongkol Sithchuchok|| Lumpinee Stadium || Bangkok, Thailand || Decision  || 5 || 3:00
|-  style="background:#cfc;"
| 1994-03-25|| Win ||align=left| Sangtiennoi Sor.Rungroj|| Lumpinee Stadium  || Bangkok, Thailand || Decision || 5 || 3:00
|-
! colspan="8" style="background:white" |
|-  style="background:#cfc;"
| 1994-02-13|| Win ||align=left| Sakmongkol Sithchuchok|| Lumpinee Stadium || Bangkok, Thailand || Decision  || 5 || 3:00
|-
! colspan="8" style="background:white" |
|-  style="background:#cfc;"
| 1994- || Win ||align=left| Sangtiennoi Sor.Rungroj|| Lumpinee Stadium  || Bangkok, Thailand || TKO (Doctor Stoppage)|| 4 ||
|-  style="background:#fbb;"
| ? || Loss||align=left| Panomrunglek Chor.Sawat || Lumpinee Stadium  || Bangkok, Thailand || Decision || 5 || 3:00

|-  style="background:#fbb;"
| 1993-08-25|| Loss ||align=left| Pairot Wor.Wolapon || Lumpinee Stadium  || Bangkok, Thailand || Decision || 5 || 3:00
|-  style="background:#cfc;"
| 1993-|| Win ||align=left| Dida Diafat || Crocodile Farm  || Samut Prakan, Thailand || Decision || 5 || 3:00
|-  style="background:#cfc;"
| 1993-|| Win ||align=left| Panomrunglek Chor.Sawat || Lumpinee Stadium  || Bangkok, Thailand || Decision || 5 || 3:00
|-  style="background:#cfc;"
| 1993-05-04|| Win ||align=left| Petchdam Lukborai || Lumpinee Stadium  || Bangkok, Thailand || Decision || 5 || 3:00
|-  style="background:#fbb;"
| 1993-03-23 || Loss ||align=left| Therdkiat Sitthepitak || Lumpinee Stadium || Bangkok, Thailand || Decision || 5 ||3:00

|-  style="background:#fbb;"
| 1993-02-26 || Loss||align=left| Nuathoranee Thongraja || Lumpinee Stadium || Bangkok, Thailand || Decision || 5 ||3:00

|-  style="background:#cfc;"
| 1993-01-29 || Win ||align=left| Cherry Sor Wanich || Lumpinee Stadium || Bangkok, Thailand || Decision || 5 ||3:00
|-  style="background:#cfc;"
| 1992-12-24|| Win ||align=left| Sangtiennoi Sor.Rungroj|| Lumpinee Stadium  || Bangkok, Thailand || Decision || 5 || 3:00
|-  style="background:#cfc;"
| 1992-11-13 || Win ||align=left| Jaroenthong Kiatbanchong || Lumpinee Stadium || Bangkok, Thailand || Referee Stoppage  ||  ||

|-  style="background:#cfc;"
| 1992-10-23 || Win ||align=left| Orono Por Muang Ubon || Lumpinee Stadium || Bangkok, Thailand || Decision || 5 || 3:00
|-  style="background:#fbb;"
| 1992-09-12 || Loss||align=left| Superlek Sorn E-Sarn || Lumpinee Stadium || Bangkok, Thailand || KO || 3 ||
|-  style="background:#fbb;"
| 1992-06-09 || Loss ||align=left| Cherry Sor Wanich || Lumpinee Stadium || Bangkok, Thailand || Decision || 5 ||3:00

|-  style="background:#cfc;"
| 1992- || Win ||align=left| Jirasak Por Pongsawang || Lumpinee Stadium || Bangkok, Thailand || KO || 3 ||
|-  style="background:#cfc;"
| 1992-04-24 || Win ||align=left| Superlek Sorn E-Sarn || Lumpinee Stadium || Bangkok, Thailand || Decision || 5 || 3:00
|-  style="background:#c5d2ea;"
| 1992-03-01 || Draw||align=left| Yodawut Sitmaek  || Lumpinee Stadium || Bangkok, Thailand || Decision  || 5 || 3:00
|-  style="background:#fbb;"
| 1991-11-16 || Loss ||align=left| Boonlertlek Sor.Nantana || Lumpinee Stadium || Bangkok, Thailand || KO || 3 ||
|-  style="background:#fbb;"
| 1991-09-27 || Loss||align=left| Tanooin Chor.Cheuchart || Lumpinee Stadium || Bangkok, Thailand || Decision  || 5 || 3:00
|-  style="background:#cfc;"
| 1991-08-10 || Win ||align=left| Detduang Por Pongsawang || Lumpinee Stadium || Bangkok, Thailand || Decision || 5 || 3:00
|-  style="background:#fbb;"
| 1991-06-29 || Loss||align=left| Kaonar Por Kettalingchan || Lumpinee Stadium || Bangkok, Thailand || Decision  || 5 || 3:00
|-  style="background:#fbb;"
| 1991-02-12 || Loss||align=left| Kruekchai Por Kettalingchan || Lumpinee Stadium || Bangkok, Thailand || Decision  || 5 || 3:00
|-  style="background:#c5d2ea;"
| 1991-01-25 || Draw||align=left| Kruekchai Por Kettalingchan || Lumpinee Stadium || Bangkok, Thailand || Decision  || 5 || 3:00
|-  style="background:#fbb;"
| 1990-12-07 || Loss||align=left| Tukatathong Por Pongsawang || Lumpinee Stadium || Bangkok, Thailand || Decision  || 5 || 3:00
|-  style="background:#cfc;"
| 1990-11-09 || Win ||align=left| Toto Por Pongsawang || Lumpinee Stadium || Bangkok, Thailand || Decision || 5 || 3:00
|-  style="background:#fbb;"
| 1990-09-25 || Loss||align=left| Pongsiri Por Ruamrudee || Lumpinee Stadium || Bangkok, Thailand || Decision  || 5 || 3:00
|-  style="background:#fbb;"
| 1990-08-21 || Loss||align=left| Kompayak Singmanee || Lumpinee Stadium || Bangkok, Thailand || Decision  || 5 || 3:00
|-  style="background:#fbb;"
| 1990-08-03 || Loss||align=left| Panphet Muangsurin || Lumpinee Stadium || Bangkok, Thailand || Decision  || 5 || 3:00
|-  style="background:#cfc;"
| 1990-07-10|| Win ||align=left| Paruhatlek Sitchunthong || Lumpinee Stadium || Bangkok, Thailand || Decision || 5 || 3:00
|-  style="background:#cfc;"
| 1990-05-15 || Win ||align=left| Orono Por Muang Ubon || Lumpinee Stadium || Bangkok, Thailand || Decision || 5 || 3:00
|-  style="background:#cfc;"
| 1990-04-24 || Win ||align=left| Pornsak Muangsurin || Lumpinee Stadium || Bangkok, Thailand || Decision || 5 || 3:00
|-  style="background:#fbb;"
| 1990- || Loss ||align=left| Thongchai Tor.Silachai || Lumpinee Stadium || Bangkok, Thailand || Decision || 5 || 3:00
|-  style="background:#cfc;"
| 1990-02-24 || Win ||align=left| Chalongchai Kiatasawin || Lumpinee Stadium || Bangkok, Thailand || Decision || 5 || 3:00
|-  style="background:#cfc;"
| 1989-11-03 || Win ||align=left| Nungubon Sitlerchai || Lumpinee Stadium || Bangkok, Thailand || Decision  || 5 || 3:00
|-
| colspan=9 | Legend:

References

Living people
1973 births
Lightweight kickboxers
Welterweight kickboxers
Muay Thai trainers
Chandet Sor Prantalay
Lightweight mixed martial artists
Mixed martial artists utilizing Muay Thai
Mixed martial artists utilizing boxing
Chandet Sor Prantalay
Chandet Sor Prantalay
Kickboxing trainers
Chandet Sor Prantalay